Maha Aungmye Township (also known as Mahaaungmye Township) is located immediately south of downtown Mandalay, Myanmar. It is the major residential area of Mandalay. The township is bounded by the Ayeyarwady river in the west, Chanayethazan Township in the north, Chanmyathazi Township in the south. The city's main university, Mandalay University is located here.

Notable places
 Mandalay University

References

Townships of Mandalay
Townships of Mandalay Region
Mandalay